As of September 2019, TUI fly Belgium operates to the following destinations:

List

References

Lists of airline destinations